Morten L Kringelbach is a professor of neuroscience at University of Oxford, UK and Aarhus University, Denmark. He is the director of the 'Centre for Eudaimonia and Human Flourishing', fellow of Linacre College, Oxford and board member of the Empathy Museum.

Research overview
Kringelbach has made contributions to a range of topics within neuroscience using neuroimaging, deep brain stimulation and whole-brain modelling. His research is focused on reverse-engineering the human brain and in particular he has 
identified some of the evolutionary principles and heuristics of teleological computation enabling us to survive and thrive, which 
depend on intact human brain systems related to emotion, pleasure and eudaimonia. Together with Kent Berridge he has 
identified brain mechanisms underlying the reward system and identified a network of hedonic hotspots essential for the fundamental pleasure cycle of 'wanting', 'liking' and learning. In a large series of neuroimaging studies of many rewards, he has elucidated the spatiotemporal organisation of the orbitofrontal cortex, e.g. demonstrating a fast parental signature of infant cuteness even in adults who are not yet parents. 
They have also investigated the close links between pleasure and happiness.

Kringelbach has also worked with neurosurgeon Tipu Aziz to elucidate the neural mechanisms of deep brain stimulation for Parkinson's disease, essential tremor, dystonia and chronic pain

Together with Peter Vuust, he founded the 'Center for Music in the Brain' at University of Aarhus focused on better understanding the neuroscience of music and in particular the dual questions of how music is processed in the brain and how this can inform our understanding of fundamental principles behind brain functioning in general.

Furthermore, Kringelbach and Gustavo Deco have developed a research programme of whole-brain modelling for combining structural connectivity data Diffusion Tensor Imaging with functional neuroimaging data such as fMRI and magnetoencephalography. This allows for the discovery of causal mechanisms of brain function, and they have e.g. identified fundamental mechanisms and principles of integration and segregation, as well as metastability and coherence. In time, these findings might help open up for a better understanding and potential treatment of neuropsychiatric disorders  as well as the role of one of the cardinal symptoms, namely anhedonia, the lack of pleasure.

See also
 Connectome
 Happiness
 Resting state fMRI
 Motivation
 Pleasure
 Reward system
 Biologically inspired computing

References

Bibliography
Books
 Kringelbach M.L. & Phillips, H. (2014) Emotion: pleasure and pain in the brain. Oxford: Oxford University Press.
 Preston S., Kringelbach M.L. & Knutson, B., eds. (2014) The Interdisciplinary Science of Consumption. Cambridge, Mass.: MIT Press.
 Hansen P.C., Kringelbach M.L & Salmelin R, eds. (2010) MEG: an introduction to methods. New York: Oxford University Press.
 Cornelissen P.L., Hansen P.C., Kringelbach M.L & Pugh K, eds. (2010) The neural basis of reading. New York: Oxford University Press.
 Kringelbach M.L. & Berridge, K.C., eds. (2010) Pleasures of the Brain. New York: Oxford University Press.
 Kringelbach M.L (2009) The Pleasure Center. Trust your animal instincts. New York: Oxford University Press (Polish translation (2015)).
 Kringelbach M.L (2009) Njótingarsami Heilin (translation P.Nielsen). Thorshavn: Ítriv.
 Kringelbach M.L (2008) Den nydelsesfulde hjerne. Nydelsens og begærets mange ansigter. Copenhagen: Gyldendal.
 Kringelbach M.L. (2004) Hjernerum. Den følelsesfulde hjerne. Copenhagen: People’sPress.

Articles
List of All Publications

External links
 Hedonia Research Group

Living people
1970 births
Danish expatriates in England
Danish neuroscientists
Fellows of Linacre College, Oxford